The City Bank building is a heritage-listed former bank building on the corner of Lynch Street and Booroowa Street, Young, Hilltops Council, New South Wales, Australia. It is also known as the former City Bank. The property is privately owned by Graham and Joy Bargwanna. The building was added to the New South Wales State Heritage Register on 2 April 1999.

History 
The Bank, described as "handsome premises at one of the principal street corners", was constructed by Sydney contractors, Evans and Son, in 1889.

Description

Heritage listing 
The City Bank building was listed on the New South Wales State Heritage Register on 2 April 1999.

References

Attribution

External links

New South Wales State Heritage Register
Young, New South Wales
Bank buildings in New South Wales
Articles incorporating text from the New South Wales State Heritage Register